Zion Township is a township in Lake County, in the U.S. state of Illinois. Its boundaries correspond exactly to those of the city of Zion. As of the 2010 census, its population was 24,413. It was formed from Benton Township on September 12, 1930.

Geography
The stream of Kellogg Creek runs through this township. Camp Logan was located in this township.

Municipality
 Zion

Adjacent townships
 Benton Township
 Newport Township (west)

Cemeteries
The township contains two cemeteries: Lake Mound and Mt. Olivet Memorial Park.

Major highways
 Illinois Route 131
 Illinois Route 137
 Illinois Route 173

Demographics

References
 U.S. Board on Geographic Names (GNIS)
 United States Census Bureau cartographic boundary files

External links
 Zion Township official website
 US-Counties.com
 City-Data.com

Townships in Lake County, Illinois
Townships in Illinois